Brushy Peak Regional Preserve is a regional park that is part of the East Bay Regional Parks (EBRPD) and the Livermore Area Recreation and Park District (LARPD) systems. It is located in unincorporated land in Alameda County, just north of Livermore, California.

Geography

Entering the Park 
The preserve's southern boundary is across the street from Springtown, a section of Livermore that is north of the I-580. You can reach the park from Livermore by taking Vasco Road into Springtown, turning right onto Northfront Road (Altamont Pass Road), and then turning left onto Laughlin Road. As you drive north along Laughlin Road, you can see Brushy Peak Preserve on the right and housing developments to the left. After this section of Laughlin Road, the road narrows to a one-lane road with ranches on either side. The road winds through a short canyon before reaching the staging area, where a ranch is located.

Hiking Trails 
From the staging area, hiking trails go in three directions: West Side Loop Trail, Brushy Peak Loop Trail, and the Laughlin Ranch Loop.

West Side Loop Trail 
The West Side Loop Trail is a 2-mile loop trail. The trail then turns west, steadily climbing a hill, before it turns south and nears the top of the  peak. At this point, it begins to come back down the hill and returns to the staging area.

The West Side Loop Trail runs closest to the Vasco Landfill. As a result, birds can often be seen crowding around the hills to the west of Brushy Peak Regional Preserve. This is most easily seen from the West Side Loop Trail.

Brushy Peak Loop Trail 
The Brushy Peak Loop Trail opened in 2008. The trail follows an old ranch road past several small ponds. The trail turns here, climbing the side of a hill which is covered in eucalyptus trees. The trail continues to rise, becoming a single track trail. It continues to climb through a region of scattered rocks. The narrow trail then goes through a pass and winds down the west side of Brushy Peak. At this point, the trail turns south, winding along Brushy Creek until it reaches the West Side Trail.

Laughlin Ranch Loop / Tamcan Trail 
A collection of shorter trails dominate the southeast section of the park. Windmills can be seen from these trails. The southernmost trail in this region of the park, the Dyer Ranch Trail, connects with Laughlin Road near Springtown.

History

Native Americans 
The park is named for Brushy Peak (elevation ), a mountain in the Diablo Range, that has had historical significance dating back to Native Americans who lived in the region before the arrival of European settlers. It was a focus of trade routes that connected the Bay Area Ohlones, Bay Miwoks, and Northern Valley Yokuts. According to the EBRPD, "The Ssaoam triblet of the Ohlone peoples was probably the most closely linked to the Brushy Peak area, living in the surrounding dry hills and tiny valleys around the peak and nearby Altamont Pass. Ssaoam populations in the dry summer months may have dispersed and reconverged at various camps throughout the year."

European Settlement 
The first European to make an expedition into this part of California was Pedro Fages, who passed through the Livermore Valley in 1772, on his return from Monterey. Mission San Jose (in present-day Fremont) was founded in 1797, and the Ssaoams lived there from 1806 to 1836. As mission lands were converted into ranchos by the Mexican government, some of the people left Mission San Jose to work as laborers on the new ranchos. The land was probably grazing land for cattle from Rancho Cañada Los Vaqueros.

During the California gold rush, Brushy Peak became a hideout for bandits, most notably Joaquin Murietta (1829 - 1853). By the 1870s, the land around the peak was becoming increasingly occupied by immigrants from the east, and less hospitable to the outlaws. In 1900 and 1901, the Bohemian Club of San Francisco held outings on the top of the peak.

Modern History 
The Livermore Area Recreation and Park District (LARPD) identified Brushy Peak as a potential city park in the early 1970s, and acquired  for that purpose in 1974. In 1997, LARPD and EBRPD formally agreed to cooperate in the further acquisition, planning, and protection of Brushy Peak Regional Preserve.

On April 3, 2014, two conservation groups, Center for Biological Diversity and the Alameda Creek Alliance, announced the acquisition of a  land parcel known as "Eddie's Flat", adjacent to the western boundary of Brushy Peak Regional Preserve.

Access 
Hours vary through the year, so potential visitors should call 888-EBPARKS (888-327-2757), option 3, extension 4512 about times. There is no access fee.

Access to the top of the mountain is closed to the public to protect grounds that were sacred to ancient Native American tribes. 

LARPD offers guided tours to the top of Brushy Peak and to the northern part of the park. Call LARPD at (925) 373-5707 for information.

Note: Although a restroom exists, there is no drinking water at the park. Visitors need to bring their own.

Activities
The park offers opportunities for hiking, biking and nature study. Dog walking is permitted. Dogs must be on a leash at all times.

The Brushy Peak parking area is one of the two staging areas and points of departure for tour buses that carry passengers into Vasco Caves Regional Preserve for pre-reserved tours.  The other staging area is at Round Valley Regional Preserve

Notes

References

See also
"East Bay Wild!" Word Press. 2017. Accessed December 26, 2017. Photographs and text describing Brushy Peak Regional Park Preserve.

External links 
East Bay Regional Park District.org: official Brushy Peak Regional Preserve website
Livermore Area Recreation and Park District:  official Brushy Peak Regional Preserve website

East Bay Regional Park District
Parks in Alameda County, California
Diablo Range
Livermore, California
Pre-statehood history of California
Protected areas established in 1974